Asterolasia squamuligera, commonly known as yellow starbush, is a species of erect, woody, slender perennial shrub that is endemic to the southwest of Western Australia. It has leathery, egg-shaped leaves with the narrower end towards the base and yellow flowers arranged in umbels of five to ten with a fringe of scales on the back of the petals, and about ten stamens.

Description

Taxonomy
This species was first formally described in 1848 by William Jackson Hooker who gave it the name Phebalium squamuligerum and published the description in Icones Plantarum from specimens collected by James Drummond.

In 1863, George Bentham changed the name to Asterolasia squamuligera, publishing the change in Flora Australiensis.

Distribution and habitat
This species grows on laterite on hilltops and flats from near Augusta east to Lake Grace and from Beverley south to Mount Barker.

Conservation status
Asterolasia squamuligera is classified as "not threatened" by the Government of Western Australia Department of Parks and Wildlife.

References

squamuligera
Rosids of Western Australia
Plants described in 1863
Taxa named by William Jackson Hooker